California Demise is an EP released by The Olivia Tremor Control.  Recorded at 210 Sunset Ave on various four tracks by Bill Doss, Jeff Mangum, Will Cullen Hart and a few others.  This was the second Elephant Six 7-inch EP (e6002). In 2000 the tracks were collected and placed on the Singles and Beyond compilation.

Track listing
"Love Athena" - 2:39
"Today I Lost A Tooth" - 1:20
"California Demise pt. 1" - 1:21
"California Demise pt. 2" - 1:13
"A Sunshine Fix" - 2:48
"Fireplace" - 3:28

1994 debut EPs
The Olivia Tremor Control albums
The Elephant 6 Recording Company EPs